This is a list of characters that appear (or have appeared) on the soap opera, The Young and the Restless.

A

B

C

D

E

F

G

H

I

J

K

L

M

N

O

P

Q

R

S

T

U

V

W

Y

References